Mahali or Mahli may refer to:
 Mahli, tribe in India
 Mahali (biblical figure), an individual mentioned in the Hebrew Bible
 Mars Hand Lens Imager (MAHLI), a type of camera on the Curiosity rover on the Mars Science Laboratory mission